The boys' super-G competition of the alpine skiing events at the 2012 Winter Youth Olympics in Innsbruck, Austria, was held on January 14, at Patscherkofel. 55 athletes from 47 different countries took part in this event.

Results
The race was started at 12:30.

References 

Alpine skiing at the 2012 Winter Youth Olympics